This is a list of notable people from Safed.

Born in Safed

Mahmoud Abbas (born 1935), Palestinian president since 2005
Jussuf Abbo (1890–1953), Palestinian Jewish sculptor and printmaker who was successful in Germany in the 1920s
 Modi Alon (1921–1948), Israeli fighter pilot
Moshe Amar (1922–2015), politician who served as a member of Knesset between 1977 and 1981
 Elazar ben Moshe Azikri (1533–1600), kabbalist and poet
 Yehoshua Bar-Yosef (1912–1992), writer
Giovanni Giuda Giona Battista (1588-1668),  rabbi who converted to Catholicism
Fazil Bey (1789–1810), author of Zenanname (The Book of Women)
 Yehuda Cohen (1914–2009), Israeli Supreme Court justice
 Yaakov Shaul Elyashar (1817–1906), Sephardi Chief Rabbi
Wadie Haddad (1927–1978), also known as Abu Hani, the Palestinian leader of the Popular Front for the Liberation of Palestine's armed wing
 Chaim Hirschensohn (1857–1935), rabbi
Salma Jayyusi (c. 1926), Palestinian-Jordanian poet and translator
Subhi al-Khadra (1954–1895), Palestinian Arab politician, lawyer, and newspaper columnist
 Baruch Maman (born 1955), Israeli footballer
Meir Meivar (1918–2000), the Haganah commander of Safed during 1948 and mayor of Safed between 1965 and 1966
 Chava Mond (born 1984), Israeli model
 Israel ben Moses Najara (c. 1555–c. 1625), Jewish poet
Itay Ne'eman, UCLA mathematics professor and logician
Esther Ofarim (born 1941), folk singer
Yogev Ohayon (born 1987), basketball player
Samir al-Rifai (1901–1965), politician who served six times as Jordanian prime minister
 Moshe Roas (born 1981), artist
Nabil Shaath (born 1938), negotiator for the Palestinian National Authority and its first foreign minister
 Khalīl b. Aybak al-Ṣafadī, author and historian
 Al-Khalidi al-Safadi (died 1625),  Ottoman historian and the Hanafi mufti of Safed
 The Shadow (born 1977),  rapper
 Moshe Shamir (1921–2004), author
 Khen Shish (born 1970), painter and installation artist
 Ilan Shohat (born 1974), mayor of Safed from 2008 to 2018
 Hayyim ben Joseph Vital (1542–1620), Jewish rabbi and disciple of Isaac Luria

Notable residents of Safed

Shlomo Halevi Alkabetz (c. 1500–1576), 16th-century rabbi, kabbalist and poet perhaps best known for his composition of the song "Lecha Dodi"
Moshe Alshich (1508–1593), prominent rabbi, preacher, and biblical commentator in the latter part of the 16th century
Jacob Berab (1474–1546), influential rabbi and talmudist of the 15th century best known for his attempt to reintroduce rabbinic ordination
Moses ben Jacob Cordovero (1522–1570), leader of mystical school in Safed in the 16th century
Shmuel Eliyahu (born 1956), Chief Rabbi of Safed
Yitzhak Frenkel Frenel (1899–1981), father of Israeli modern art. Important Jewish artist of the Ecole de Paris, influenced and taught many notable artists. Amongst the founders of the Artists Colony/Quarter of Tzfat and amongst the first artists to settle in Safed.
Shimshon Holzman (1907–1986), artist
Joseph Karo (1488–1575), 16th-century rabbi, and author of the great codification of Jewish law, the Shulchan Aruch
Lior Lubin (born 1979), basketball player and coach
Isaac Luria (1534–1572), rabbi and Jewish mystic of the 16th century in the community of Safed in Ottoman Palestine. He is considered the father of contemporary Kabbalah.
Miriam Mehadipur (born 1960), Tzfat resident Israeli artist since 1999 of Dutch birth, owner of Mehadipur + Collection
Moshe of Trani (1500–1580), rabbi of Safed from 1525 until 1535
Possibly the Biblical Woman with seven sons whose tomb is often said to be an ancient tomb discovered in the old cemetery of the city

References

People from Safed
Safed